The 2008–09 Horizon League men's basketball season marks the 29th season of Horizon League basketball.

Conference awards & honors

Weekly awards
HL Players of the Week
Throughout the conference season, the HL offices name a player of the week.

All-Conference Honors

Tournament honors

Cedric Jackson of Cleveland State was named the tournament MVP.

References

External links
HL Official website